This is a list of seasons played by Sligo Rovers Football Club in Irish and European football, from 1934 (year of entry into the League of Ireland) to the most recent completed season. The list details the club's achievements in the League of Ireland

Seasons

Key

Key to league record:
P = Played
W = Games won
D = Games drawn
L = Games lost
F = Goals for
A = Goals against
Pts = Points
Pos = Final position

Key to divisions:
Premier = LOI Premier Division
First = LOI First Division

Notes
A.  Prior to 1985 there was just one division. Six new teams were introduced for the 1985-86 season and the league was split into two divisions.

B.  An experimental points system was operated for the 1981-82 season whereby a team was awarded four points for an away win, three points for a home win, two points for an away draw and one point for a home draw.

C.  In 1982-83 three points were awarded for a win and one point for a draw. The system reverted the following season to the pre-1981-82 system, i.e. two points for a win and one point for a draw.

D.  In 1992-93 the Premier Division 'split' into two sections of six after the 22nd series of games had been played on 17 January.

 
Sligo Rovers
Sligo Rovers